"Brand New Love Affair" sometimes alternatively listed as "Brand New Love Affair (Parts I and II)", is a song written by James Pankow for the group Chicago and recorded for their album Chicago VIII. The song peaked at #61 on the charts. Guitarist Terry Kath sings the first half while bassist Peter Cetera sings the second half. Keyboardist Robert Lamm played the distinctive Fender Rhodes electric piano on the song—the intro particularly showcases its lush vibrato bell-like sound.

Cash Box said it has "low key . . . Ray Charles style painful/mature/emotional vocal."

Personnel

Part One
 Terry Kath - lead vocals, electric guitars
 Robert Lamm - backing vocals, Fender Rhodes electric piano, Hammond organ
 Peter Cetera - backing vocals, bass
 Danny Seraphine - drums
 Laudir de Oliveira - wind chimes
 James Pankow - trombone
 Lee Loughnane - trumpet
 Walter Parazaider - alto saxophone

Part Two
 Peter Cetera - lead vocals, bass
 Terry Kath - backing vocals, electric guitars (special effects: fuzzbox and wah-wah pedal)
 Robert Lamm - backing vocals, Fender Rhodes electric piano, piano
 Danny Seraphine - drums
 Laudir de Oliveira - tambourine, temple blocks, congas
 James Pankow - trombone
 Lee Loughnane - trumpet
 Walter Parazaider - alto saxophone

Patrick Williams provided the orchestration on both parts of the song

References

1975 singles
Songs written by James Pankow
Chicago (band) songs
Columbia Records singles
1975 songs